Sun Feiyan (born ) is a Chinese female  track cyclist, and part of the national team. She competed in the team pursuit and scratch event at the 2009 UCI Track Cycling World Championships in Pruszków, Poland.

References

External links
 Profile at cyclingarchives.com

1989 births
Living people
Chinese track cyclists
Chinese female cyclists
Place of birth missing (living people)
21st-century Chinese women